The ABA League, renamed to the ABA League First Division in 2017, is the top-tier regional men's professional basketball league that originally featured clubs from the former Yugoslavia (Bosnia and Herzegovina, Croatia, Montenegro, North Macedonia, Serbia and Slovenia). Due to sponsorship reasons, the league was also known as the Goodyear League from 2001 to 2006, the NLB League from 2006 to 2011, and as the AdmiralBet ABA League from 2021.

The league coexists alongside scaled-down national leagues in Bosnia and Herzegovina, Croatia, North Macedonia, Montenegro, Serbia, and Slovenia. All but one of Adriatic League clubs join their country's own competitions in late spring after the Adriatic League regular season and post-season have been completed. In the past, the league has also consisted of clubs from Bulgaria (Levski), the Czech Republic (ČEZ Nymburk), Hungary (Szolnoki Olaj), and Israel (Maccabi Tel Aviv) that received wild card invitations.

The Adriatic League is a private venture, founded in 2001 and run until 2015 by the Sidro, a Slovenian limited liability company. Since 2015, the league has been operated by ABA League JTD, a Zagreb-based general partnership for organizing sports competitions. Adriatic Basketball Association is the body that organizes the league and is a full member of ULEB, as well as a voting member of Euroleague Basketball's board.

History
At various points throughout mid-to-late 1990s, in the years following the breakup of SFR Yugoslavia and ensuing Yugoslav Wars, different basketball administrators from the newly independent Balkan states floated and informally discussed the idea of re-assembling a joint basketball competition to fill the void left by the dissolution of the former Yugoslav Basketball League whose last season was 1991–92.

However, no concrete action towards that end was taken before the summer 2000 ULEB-supported creation of Euroleague Basketball Company under the leadership of Jordi Bertomeu that immediately confronted FIBA Europe, then proceeded to take a handful of top European clubs into its new competition for the 2000–01 season thereby opening an organizational split in European club basketball. During the 2000–01 split in the continent's top club competition, local Balkan basketball administrators from the ULEB-affiliated clubs Cibona, Olimpija, and Budućnost (that already competed in this new 'breakaway' Euroleague competition) shifted the discussions of creating a regional Balkan-wide basketball league into higher gear.

On the public relations front, Adriatic League was met with strong and mixed reactions. Though many hailed it as an important step for the development of club basketball in the Balkans region, many others felt that it brings no new quality and that it's not worth dismantling three domestic leagues. There was a lot of negative reaction from political circles, especially in Croatia, with even TV panel discussions being broadcast on Croatian state television. A very vociferous opinion in the country saw the league's formation as a political attempt to reinstate Yugoslavia. The league organizers for their part did their best to appease the Croatian public with statements such as the one delivered by Radovan Lorbek in Slobodna Dalmacija in September 2001: 
Ten years later, in a 2011 interview for the Serbian newspaper Press, Roman Lisac explained the league's behind the scenes strategy during its nascent stages was actually quite different: 
On 28 September 2001, the league announced a five-year sponsorship deal with Slovenian company Sava Tires from Kranj, a subsidiary of Goodyear Tire and Rubber Company. The deal also included naming rights, hence from 2001 until 2006, the competition was known as the Goodyear League.

Debut season
With twelve clubs taking part in the inaugural 2001–02 season, the competition commenced in fall 2001 with four teams from Slovenia, four teams from Croatia, three teams from Bosnia-Herzegovina, and one team from FR Yugoslavia. The very first game was contested in Ljubljana between Olimpija and Široki on Saturday, 29 September 2001 at 5:30pm.

Though the competition purported to gather the strongest sides from former Yugoslavia, as mentioned, teams from Serbia were noticeably absent, particularly Belgrade powerhouses and biggest regional crowd draws Partizan and Crvena zvezda. In addition to no clubs from Serbia proper, the league had no Serb-dominated clubs from Bosnia-Herzegovina either. Since the league founders mostly avoided talking about the issue due to fears of media backlash, the fact that no invitations were extended to Serbian clubs was generally explained through security issues due to organizers' fears of crowd trouble if Croatian and Serbian clubs were to start playing again in the same competition. Then in early February 2002, the public got a preview of just that when Cibona and Partizan met in Zagreb as part of that season's EuroLeague group stage. In a nationalistically charged and incident-filled encounter, Croatian fans peppered the Partizan players with rocks, flares, and even ceramic tiles before physically assaulting Partizan head coach Duško Vujošević in the guest team dressing room after the game.

The Adriatic League debut season was marked by dwindling attendances and lukewarm media support. Still the league did receive a bit of a shot in the arm on 24 February 2002, when its managing body ABA got accepted as full member of ULEB.

Second season
For the 2002–03 season, the league remained at the total number of 12 teams, while it went through major re-tooling internally. By the time season started, four teams dropped out (Sloboda Dita, Budućnost, Triglav, and Geoplin Slovan) to be replaced by: Israeli powerhouse Maccabi Tel Aviv, Crvena zvezda (the first team from Serbia in the competition), the Bosnian outfit KK Borac, and Croatian club KK Zagreb.

It was important for the league's long-term business to negotiate acceptable terms for the Serbian clubs to join the competition. To that end, Lorbek and Lisac went to Belgrade in early April 2002 with an offer of taking in three clubs from FR Yugoslavia for the Adriatic League's 2002–03 season. The offer was flatly rejected initially by the representatives of five YUBA Liga clubs – Partizan, Crvena zvezda, Hemofarm, FMP, and Budućnost – as their unified platform was either all five or nothing. Taking in all five required expanding the league to 14 teams, which was something the league organizers weren't prepared to do due to the associated increase in operating costs. The negotiated agreement thus fell through for the time being. However, it didn't take long for dents to appear in the unified front put forth by five YUBA league clubs – in May 2002 Crvena zvezda's management (three businessmen close to the ruling Democratic Party in Serbia: Živorad Anđelković, Igor Žeželj, and Goran Vesić) hired Zmago Sagadin to be the club's new general manager – and soon after, in June 2002, the club broke the ranks by negotiating terms on its own thus agreeing to join the Adriatic League for the 2002–03 season.

Competition

Competition system
As of the 2013–14 season the league comprises a 26-game regular season, with the top 4 sides making the play-offs.

From 2002 through 2004, four teams qualified, and the playoffs were termed the "Final Four"; starting in 2005, eight teams advanced to the "Final Eight" round. All playoff rounds consist of one-off knockout matches, unusual among European leagues. However, since all Adriatic League clubs play in domestic leagues at the same time, and many also play in the EuroLeague, the current format has the virtue of limiting fixture congestion for the playoff sides.

In 2017, the ABA League Second Division was created. The last qualified team from ABA League would be relegated to the Second Division and replaced by the winner of this one.

Current clubs 
The following 14 clubs are competing in the 2022–23 ABA season:

Finals

Records and statistics

By club

By country

All-time participants
The following is a list of clubs who have played in the Adriatic League at any time since its formation in 2001 to the current season. A total of 41 teams from 10 countries have played in the League.

Awards
 ABA League MVP
 ABA League Finals MVP
 ABA League Top Scorer
 ABA League Ideal Starting Five
 ABA League Top Prospect
 ABA League Player of the Month
 ABA League-winning head coaches

Records
Source:

Players
Highest Index Ratings in a Game
59 by Dejan Milojević, Budućnost vs Reflex on 3 January 2004
Most Points in a Game
47 by Daron Russell, Mornar vs. Zadar on 9 October 2022
Most Two Point Field Goals Made in a Game
17 by Márton Báder, Szolnoki Olaj at Široki on 7 October 2012
Most Three Point Field Goals Made in a Game
10 by Josip Sesar, Široki vs. Union Olimpija on 19 November 2005
10 by Teemu Rannikko, Union Olimpija at Zagreb on 18 December 2005
Most Free Throws Made in a Game
19 by Igor Rakočević, Crvena zvezda at Reflex on 16 April 2004
19 by Milan Gurović, Crvena zvezda at FMP on 30 September 2006
19 by Milan Gurović, Crvena zvezda vs. FMP on 16 December 2006
19 by Damir Mulaomerović, Zagreb vs. FMP on 19 January 2010
Most Rebounds in a Game
23 by Tommy Smith, Split vs. Reflex on 4 October 2003
23 by Boris Savović, Hemofarm vs. Radnički Kragujevac on 22 October 2011
Most Assists in a Game
19 by Žan Mark Šiško, Primorska vs. Zadar on 9 December 2019
Most Steals in a Game
9 by Curtis McCants, Split vs. Zagreb on 16 December 2003
9 by Andrés Rodríguez, Union Olimpija at Partizan on 7 November 2004
9 by Jure Močnik, Helios at Split on 6 April 2005
9 by Goran Jeretin, Crvena Zvezda at Partizan on 30 April 2005
Most Blocks in a Game
7 by Smiljan Pavič, Union Olimpija vs. Bosna on 27 November 2004
7 by Slavko Vraneš, Partizan at Cibona on 10 January 2010
7 by Shawn James, Maccabi Tel Aviv vs. Zlatorog Laško on 5 January 2012
7 by Zoran Nikolić, Budućnost vs. Igokea on 15 October 2016
7 by Uroš Luković, Mornar vs. Mega Basket on 14 December 2019
Most Turnovers in a Game
11 by Jiří Welsch, Union Olimpija at Pivovarna Laško on 9 February 2002
11 by Nikola Korać, Sutjeska at Mega Basket on 30 October 2015

Clubs
Longest winning streak
20 games by Crvena zvezda for the 2014–15 and 2016–17 seasons
Longest losing streak
21 games by Levski Sofia for the 2014–15 season
Biggest Winning Margin
60 points by Partizan vs. Split in the 2021–22 season
Most Won Games in a Season
 Crvena zvezda won 25 out of 26 games for the 2016–17 season
Most Lost Games in a Season
Bosna lost 21 out of 22 games for the 2002–03 season
Most Points scored in a Season
Hemofarm scored 2591 points in 30 games for the 2004–05 season
Crvena zvezda scored 2325 points in 26 games for the 2006–07 season
Lowest Scored Points in a Season
Bosna scored 1443 points in 22 games for the 2001–02 season
Zlatorog Laško scored 1688 points in 26 games for the 2011–12 season

All-time leaders
From the 2001–02 to the 2020–21 season:

{| class="wikitable"
|-
!width="420" colspan="3" |Accumulated
|-
! Points
|  Nemanja Gordić ||align=center| 3,050
|-
! Field goals
|   Nemanja Gordić  ||align=center| 1,056
|-
! 3 Points
|  Siniša Štemberger ||align=center| 403
|-
! Defensive Rebounds
|  Marin Rozić||align=center| 1,043
|-
! Total Rebounds
|  Marin Rozić||align=center| 1,327
|-
! Assists
|  Nemanja Gordić||align=center| 1,022
|-
! Steals
|  Nebojša Joksimović||align=center| 401
|-
! Blocks
|  Slavko Vraneš||align=center| 272
|-
! Index Ratings
|  Todor Gečevski ||align=center| 3,212
|-
! Games Played
|  Marin Rozić||align=center| 377

Notable players
Well-known basketball players who have played in the Adriatic League include:

 Australia
 Aron Baynes
 Nathan Jawai
 Aleks Marić
 Steven Marković
 Mark Worthington

 Belize
 Milt Palacio

 Bosnia and Herzegovina
 Kenan Bajramović
 J. R. Bremer
 Nemanja Gordić
 Jasmin Hukić
 Elmedin Kikanović
 Nenad Marković
 Ratko Varda
 Jusuf Nurkić

 Bulgaria
 Filip Videnov

 Jermaine Anderson
 Carl English
 Brady Heslip
 Michael Meeks

 Croatia
 Marko Banić
 Stanko Barać
 Bojan Bogdanović
 Dontaye Draper
 Davor Kus
 Oliver Lafayette
 Davor Marcelić
 Damir Mulaomerović
 Davor Pejčinović
 Zoran Planinić
 Marko Popović
 Nikola Prkačin
 Dino Rađa
 Slaven Rimac
 Josip Sesar
 Krunoslav Simon
 Mate Skelin
 Dario Šarić
 Marko Tomas
 Ante Tomić
 Roko Ukić
 Josip Vranković
 Nikola Vujčić
 Andrija Žižić
 Ante Žižić
 Luka Žorić

 Czech Republic
 Jan Veselý
 Jiří Welsch

 Finland
 Teemu Rannikko
 Sasu Salin

 France
 Joffrey Lauvergne
 Léo Westermann
 Mickaël Gelabale
 Timothé Luwawu-Cabarrot

 Gabon
 Stéphane Lasme

 Germany
 Maik Zirbes

 Greece
 Stratos Perperoglou
 Sofoklis Schortsanitis

 Guyana
 Rawle Marshall

 Hungary
 Márton Báder
 István Németh

 Israel
 David Blu
 Tal Burstein
 Lior Eliyahu
 Yotam Halperin
 Guy Pnini
 Derrick Sharp
 Gal Mekel

 Jamaica
 Kimani Ffriend
 Jerome Jordan

 Latvia
 Roberts Štelmahers
 Dāvis Bertāns

 Montenegro
 Milko Bjelica
 Nebojša Bogavac
 Omar Cook
 Predrag Drobnjak
 Vladimir Dragičević
 Aleksandar Pavlović
 Nikola Peković
 Slavko Vraneš

 Nigeria
 Aloysius Anagonye
 Obinna Ekezie
 Michael Ojo

 North Macedonia
 Pero Antić
 Todor Gečevski
 Richard Hendrix
 Vlado Ilievski
 Bo McCalebb
 Gjorgji Čekovski
 Predrag Samardžiski
 Damjan Stojanovski
 Aleksandar Kostoski
 Marko Simonovski
 Bojan Trajkovski
 Darko Sokolov
 Ognen Stojanovski

 Panama
 Chris Warren

 Puerto Rico
 Larry Ayuso
 Andrés Rodríguez

 Serbia
 Ognjen Aškrabić
 Vule Avdalović
 Stefan Birčević
 Nemanja Bjelica
 Bogdan Bogdanović
 Petar Božić
 Marko Gudurić
 Milan Gurović
 Tadija Dragićević
 Mile Ilić
 Nikola Janković
 Nikola Jokić
 Stefan Jović
 Nikola Kalinić
 Dušan Kecman
 Ognjen Kuzmić
 Nikola Lončar
 Milan Mačvan
 Boban Marjanović
 Stefan Marković
 Dejan Milojević
 Dragan Milosavljević
 Nikola Milutinov
 Luka Mitrović
 Miljan Pavković
 Kosta Perović
 Bojan Popović
 Miroslav Raduljica
 Igor Rakočević
 Aleksandar Rašić
 Duško Savanović
 Marko Simonović
 Miloš Teodosić
 Milenko Tepić
 Milenko Topić
 Uroš Tripković
 Novica Veličković
 Rade Zagorac

 Slovenia
 Sani Bečirovič
 Mirza Begić
 Jaka Blažič
 Goran Dragič
 Nebojša Joksimović
 Jaka Lakovič
 Marko Milič
 Hasan Rizvić
 Uroš Slokar
 Beno Udrih
 Gašper Vidmar
 Jurij Zdovc

 Turkey
 Ender Arslan
 Hüseyin Beşok
 Semih Erden
 Ermal Kurtoğlu
 Emir Preldžić

 Matthew Bryan-Amaning

 Alan Anderson
 Jamie Arnold
 Isaiah Austin
 Corey L. Brewer
 Elton Brown
 Vonteego Cummings
 Cade Davis
 Corsley Edwards
 Jordan Farmar
 Reggie Freeman
 James Gist
 Drew Gordon
 Jamon Gordon
 Jamont Gordon
 Marcus Goree
 Will Hatcher
 Kyle Hill
 Shawn James
 Curtis Jerrells
 Charles Jenkins
 Julius Johnson
 Keith Langford
 Acie Law
 Michael Lee
 Quincy Lewis
 Chester Mason
 Adam Morrison
 Jimmy Oliver
 Andre Owens
 Scoonie Penn
 Omar Thomas
 Torey Thomas
 Lawrence Roberts
 Rumeal Robinson
 David Simon
 Devin Smith
 Kenyan Weaks
 Marcus Williams
 Andrew Wisniewski

See also
 List of current ABA Liga team rosters
 Balkan International Basketball League (2008–)

Notes

References

External links

 
 ABA League at Sportstats.com

 
Basketball leagues in Bosnia and Herzegovina
Basketball leagues in Croatia
Basketball leagues in North Macedonia
Basketball leagues in Montenegro
Basketball leagues in Serbia
Basketball leagues in Slovenia
Basketball leagues in Serbia and Montenegro
Multi-national basketball leagues in Europe
2001 establishments in Europe
Sports leagues established in 2001
Professional sports leagues in Serbia
Professional sports leagues in Slovenia
Multi-national professional sports leagues